Waanyarra is a locality in north central Victoria, Australia.

Originally an small township existed here which arose due to the discovery of gold.   Commencing in the 1860s, the township supported 2 hotels, several stores, a school and a post office, which remained open until the 1920s. Nothing now remains other than foundations, an old cemetery and recreation reserve.

References

External links

PDF from State of Victoria Parks

Towns in Victoria (Australia)
Shire of Loddon